was a Japanese baseball player.

Career
Born in Tokyo, he was a southpaw pitcher for the First Higher School of Japan (Ikkō). He was famous for his hard training which enabled Ikkō to defeat the Yokohama Country & Athletic Club (YC&AC), the strongest team in Japan baseball during the late 1800s, after first losing to them. He later studied medicine at Tokyo Imperial University and became a military doctor, but died when he was infected by the infectious disease he was studying.

He was inducted into the Japanese Baseball Hall of Fame in 1966.

References

Japanese baseball players
Place of birth missing
University of Tokyo alumni
People from Tokyo
1912 deaths
1880 births